Juan Ignacio Chela was the defending champion but did not compete that year.

Gustavo Kuerten won in the final 6–4, 6–2 against Galo Blanco.

Seeds

  Gustavo Kuerten (champion)
  Franco Squillari (first round)
  Carlos Moyá (semifinals)
  Gastón Gaudio (quarterfinals)
  Albert Costa (second round)
  Fernando Vicente (first round)
  Francisco Clavet (first round)
  Hicham Arazi (second round)

Draw

Finals

Top half

Bottom half

Qualifying

Qualifying seeds

Qualifiers

Lucky loser
  Alexandre Simoni

Qualifying draws

First qualifier

Second qualifier

Third qualifier

Fourth qualifier

External links
 2001 Abierto Mexicano Pegaso Draw (ITF)
 2001 Abierto Mexicano Pegaso Draw (ATP)
 Main Draw Archive (ATP)
 Qualifying Draw Archive (ATP)

2001 Abierto Mexicano Pegaso
Singles